Big Horn County School District #1 is a public school district based in Cowley, Wyoming, United States.  The Superintendent is Ben Smith.  The district was consolidated in the 1980s from smaller districts in Burlington, Byron, Cowley, Deaver-Frannie.

Contact Info
Phone number (307) 548 - 2254
Mailing address:  P.O. Box 688, Cowley, WY  82420

Geography
Big Horn County School District #1 serves the northwestern portion of Big Horn County as well as a very small portion of northeastern Park County, including the following communities:

Incorporated places
Town of Burlington
Town of Byron
Town of Cowley
Town of Deaver
Town of Frannie
Unincorporated places
Otto

Schools

High schools
Grades 9-12
Burlington High School
Rocky Mountain High School

Middle/Junior High Schools
Grades 7-8
Burlington Junior High School
Grades 6-8
Rocky Mountain Middle School

Elementary schools
Grades PK-6
Burlington Elementary School
Grades PK-5
Rocky Mountain Elementary School

Student demographics
The following figures are as of October 1, 2009.

Total District Enrollment: 610
Student enrollment by gender
Male: 320 (52.46%)
Female: 290 (47.54%)
Student enrollment by ethnicity
American Indian or Alaska Native: 7 (1.15%)
Asian: 1 (0.16%)
Black or African American: 3 (0.49%)
Hispanic or Latino: 77 (12.62%)
Native Hawaiian or Other Pacific Islander: 3 (0.49%)
Two or More Races: 8 (1.31%)
White: 511 (83.77%)

See also
List of school districts in Wyoming

References

External links
Big Horn County School District #1 – official site.

Education in Big Horn County, Wyoming
Education in Park County, Wyoming
School districts in Wyoming